The DR2800 series is a series of diesel multiple unit trains operated by the Taiwan Railways Administration as Tze-chiang limited express on non-electrified mainlines. They were originally built by Tokyu Car Corporation of Japan in 1982 for the Taiwan Railways Administration to provide better service on the eastern mainline of Taiwan.

In early 1980s, the North-link line was completed, the Yilan line was expanded to double track, and the gauge of Taitung line was changed to 1067 mm. In response to the demand for air-conditioned express trains in eastern Taiwan, Taiwan Railways Administration ordered 10 sets of  diesel multiple unit trains from Tokyu Car. These train sets were heavily specialized under license from Budd, and each set consists of 2 power driving cars and a trailer. Each power driving car (designated as DR2800s) was equipped with a Cummins NT855-R4 diesel engine producing  to move the train. The trailer (designated as DR2850s) has a diesel engine to provide head-end power for the entire three-car set. Each power driving car only has a cab at one end and two power driving cars bracket a trailer in a standard set. To prevent dependency on the trailer's engine for cooling, the cooling fans of the driver cars are driven hydraulically instead of electrically. Besides, the DR2800 series is the first series of diesel railcars of Taiwan Railways Administration equipped with bogies containing air suspension.

The DR2800 series operated as Tze-chiang limited express between Taipei and Hualien on June 1, 1982.

The interior was refurbished between 2001 and 2002.

DR2800 series mainly operated as Tze-chiang limited express on the eastern mainline (including Yilan line, North-link line, and Taitung line) and South-link line. In 1991 it even ran on the west line to provide more seats during Chinese New Year. Nowadays all 15 sets are still in service. But owing to the greater gap between the platform and the car, DR2800 series now runs on Yilan line and North-link line only.

Notes

References

External links

Tokyu Car multiple units